The 1942–43 Serie A season was won by Torino.

Teams
Bari and Vicenza had been promoted from Serie B.

Events
Goal average was abolished.

This was the last championship before a two-years break due to World War II.

Final classification

Results

Relegation tie-breaker
Played in Rome, Florence and Modena.

Triestina remained in Serie A. A second round was needed and played in Bologna.

Bari relegated to Serie B.

Top goalscorers

References and sources
Almanacco Illustrato del Calcio - La Storia 1898-2004, Panini Edizioni, Modena, September 2005

External links
  - All results on RSSSF Website.

1942-43
1942–43 in European association football leagues
1